TJ Rozvoj Pušovce is a Slovak association football club located in Pušovce. It currently plays in 3. Liga (East) (3rd level).

Colors and badge 
Its colors are blue and white.

External links
Official website

References

Football clubs in Slovakia